EMCC may stand for:

East Molesey Cricket Club
Eckert–Mauchly Computer Corporation
European Market Coupling Company
European Mentoring and Coaching Council
European Monitoring Centre on Change
Evangelical Methodist Church Conference

Colleges in the United States
East Mississippi Community College
Eastern Maine Community College
Estrella Mountain Community College

Other uses
E = m × c × c is the equation for mass-energy equivalence.

See also
EMMC, a type of computer card
EMC2 (disambiguation)